The Big Smoke (1959) is a novel by Australian writer D'Arcy Niland.

Plot summary
Set in Sydney in the early part of the twentieth century, the novel is a series of stories told from the perspective of people associated with the son of an indigenous boxer, Chiddy Hay.

Critical reception
On its original publication in the USA Kirkus Review found: "The conglomerate that makes up a big city, from aboriginal to white, evil to good, and youth to age, has a sense of panorama, always colored by the Big Smoke, which is seen and recorded with observant detail."

See also 
 1959 in Australian literature

References

1959 Australian novels
Angus & Robertson books
Novels set in Sydney